A serving cart is a kind of smaller food cart. It is typically used by restaurants to deliver or display food.

Serving carts are also used in households, airplanes, and trains.

Types
 Dessert cart (known as a sweet trolley in the UK) – This is mainly used in restaurants where it is wheeled from table to table allowing customers to select a dessert.
 Dim sum cart – Used in Chinese restaurants, this type of cart contains a steam table to keep the bamboo steamers hot. It may be wheeled by servers from table to table or be stationary.
 Cocktail or wine cart
 Airline service trolley – This standardized cart contains numerous shelves to hold passenger meals. The top surface may be used for beverages.

Gallery

See also
 Food cart – a mobile kitchen that is set up on the street to facilitate the sale and marketing of street food to people
 Lazy Susan
 List of restaurant terminology
 Tray
 TV tray table

References

Further reading

External links
 

Carts
Serving and dining